Cozonac or Kozunak is a sweet yeast dough that can be used to make different traditional holiday breads and cakes. Often mixed with raisins, it can be baked as a loaf or rolled out with fillings like poppy seed or walnuts. It is common throughout Southeastern Europe, Romania, Bulgaria and Serbia, North Macedonia, Greece, etc. Rich in eggs, milk and butter, it is usually prepared for Easter in Romania, Serbia, Bulgaria, and in Romania and Moldova it is also traditional for Good Friday.

Cozonac was the sweet chosen to represent Romania in the Café Europe initiative of the Austrian presidency of the European Union, on Europe Day 2006.

Origins

In Great Britain, the first recipe of "cozonac" appears in a cookbook in 1718, with the recommendation to be baked in long and narrow forms, a recommendation that remains valid nowadays. A similar Italian dessert, Panettone, whose recipe was shared and adapted in Eastern Europe following the Roman occupation, is often mentioned as a starting point for the cozonac. 

Romanians added cocoa, rum, walnuts and Turkish delight to the composition, thus creating an original version of the dish, which was not to be missed from any Easter or Christmas table for hundreds of years and is widely recognised as a traditional dessert. 

Today, this dessert with a long history is prepared mainly in southeastern European countries, especially in North Macedonia, Romania, Moldova and Bulgaria, where it is considered a traditional food.

Ingredients and preparation

Cozonac is a sweet bread, into which milk, yeast, eggs, sugar, butter, and other ingredients are mixed together and allowed to rise before baking. In Bulgaria, the kozunak is prepared by adding lemon zest to the dough mixture, just as the Romanian version.

In North Macedonia, the Macedonians for Easter traditionally bake a sweet bread called with sultanas and raisins in the shape of a girl's plated hair, a braid. That is why the name of this traditional Easter bread is derived from the Bulgarian word for hair-коса/kosa. There is also the straw plated mat Macedonians in the past used to lay on the ground to sleep upon called Rogozina or Ruguzina.

In Romania, the recipes for trimmings differ rather significantly between regions. The dough is essentially similar throughout the country; a plain sweet bread made from flour, eggs, milk, butter, sugar and salt. Depending on the region, one may add to it any of the following: raisins, grated orange or lemon zest, walnuts or hazelnuts, and vanilla or rum flavor. Cozonac may be sprinkled with poppy seeds on top. Other styles dictate the use of a filling, usually a ground walnut mixture with ground poppy seeds, cocoa powder, rum essence, or raisins. The dough is rolled flat with a pin, the filling is spread and the whole is rolled back into a shape vaguely resembling a pinwheel. In the baked product, the filling forms a swirl adding to the character of the bread.

Similar breads
Cozonac is a sweet, egg-enriched bread, which is rooted in the cuisines of Western and Central Asia. Examples of similar breads from other cultures include badnji kruh in Croatian cuisine, folar de páscoa in Portuguese cuisine, brioche in French cuisine, kulich in Russian cuisine, panettone in Italian cuisine, hot cross bun in English cuisine, challah in Jewish cuisine, or stollen in German cuisine. Such rich brioche-like breads are also traditional in other countries, such as Hungary and the Czech Republic.

See also
 List of sweet breads
 Panettone
 Fruitcake
 Raisin bread
 Pain aux raisins
 Pască
 Tsoureki

Notes and references

External links

 Cozonac old recipes and more
 Cozonac with walnut
 Cozonac
 Cozonac Rosenkrantz
 Cozonac with cocoa ( ro cozonac cu cacao)

Easter bread
Bulgarian cuisine
Macedonian cuisine
Moldovan cuisine
Romanian breads
Christmas in Romania
Sweet breads
Christmas cakes
Yeast cakes